Truth, consisting of Tristan Roake and Andre Fernandez, is a dubstep production duo from Christchurch, New Zealand. They first rose in late 2007 when Mala of Digital Mystikz signed their debut single The Fatman / Stolen Children for his Deep Medi Musik label. The single was described by Boomkat as "dark and immaculately executed" and was released in early 2009 as Medi13x on 12" vinyl format.

This release has been followed by two more releases on Deep Medi Musik and a number of singles on labels such as Tempa, SMOG and Black Box. Collaborators have included Datsik and Alix Perez.

Originally from New Zealand, now based in San Francisco, California, Truth have toured extensively including numerous USA tours, four tours of the UK and Europe and a tour of Latin America. They can be found regularly playing in the United States, New Zealand, Australia and Europe.

Career

Puppets 

In September 2010 Truth released their debut album, entitled Puppets on Sydney based Aquatic Lab Records. The album received critical approval, including a nomination for Best Dubstep Album in the 2011 DubstepForum Awards. Knowledge Magazine lauded the album for its representation of "dubstep in its purest form" characterising it as "spacious, sub-heavy and forward-thinking", while Music Week described it as "an expansive listen that works as well on headphones as in a club". The New Zealand Herald branded Puppets "sinister yet soulful" praising its "beautifully brutal bass-laden beats".

Special Edition

In April 2011, Truth released a New Zealand-only double-CD version of Puppets. It included a bonus disc of remixes, previously unreleased material and a 35-minute mix of music from the album. The group stated that all proceeds from sales would go directly to charities involved with rebuilding Christchurch following the earthquake of February 2011.

Love's Shadow (2012)

Truth released their second album "Love's Shadow" for free via their SoundCloud page over a number of months in 2012.

Discography

References 

New Zealand electronic music groups
Remixers
Dubstep music groups
2007 establishments in New Zealand
Musical groups established in 2007
Musical groups from Christchurch